"Little Angel with the Dirty Face" is a country music song written by Dale Parker, sung by Eddy Arnold, and released on the RCA Victor label. In April 1950, it reached No. 3 on the country best seller chart. It spent 12 weeks on the charts and was the No. 18 best selling country record of 1950.

See also
 Billboard Top Country & Western Records of 1950

References

Eddy Arnold songs
1950 songs